Kamran-e Beyg Reza (also Romanized as Kāmrān-e Beyg Rez̤ā) is a village in Qalkhani Rural District, Gahvareh District, Dalahu County, Kermanshah Province, Iran. At the 2006 census, its population was 210, in 50 families.

References 

Populated places in Dalahu County